The 1971 Cork Junior Football Championship was the 73rd staging of the Cork Junior A Football Championship since its establishment by Cork County Board in 1895. The championship ran from 24 October to 19 December 1971.

The final was played on 19 December 1971 at Coachford Sportsfield, between Glanworth and Adrigole, in what was their first ever meeting in the final. Glanworth won the match by 1-08 to 0-08 to claim their first ever championship title.

Qualification

Results

Quarter-finals

Semi-finals

Final

References

1971 in Irish sport
Cork Junior Football Championship